The Temptation of the Impossible (2004) is a book-length essay by Peruvian novelist Mario Vargas Llosa which examines Victor Hugo's Les Misérables.

An English translation was published in 2007.

Reviews

References 

2004 essays
Essays about literature
Essays by Mario Vargas Llosa
2004 non-fiction books